Find (파인드) is South Korean boy band SS501's fourth Korean mini-album. It was released after their Japanese maxi single, "Lucky Days.

The album consists of three songs, instrumental versions of the two songs, and an intro. In addition, the album includes the original and acoustic version of Kim Hyun-joong's first solo track, "Thank You" (고맙다).

Two songs in the album, "You are my heaven" and "Thank You", became theme songs of MBC's reality TV show, We Got Married'', in which Kim Hyun-joong was part of the show with Hwangbo.

Track listing

Music Videos
 "Find"
 "You Are My Heaven"

References

External links

 
 

SS501 albums
2008 EPs